LiMux was a project launched by the city of Munich in 2004 in order to replace the software on its desktop computers, migrating from Microsoft Windows to free software based on Linux. By 2012, the city had migrated 12,600 of its 15,500 desktops to LiMux. In November 2017 Munich City Council resolved to reverse the migration and return to Microsoft Windows-based software by 2020. In May 2020, it was reported that the newly elected politicians in Munich, while not going back to the original plan of migrating to LiMux wholesale, will prefer Free Software for future endeavours.

The project initially used OpenOffice.org, but announced on 15 October 2012 that it would switch to LibreOffice. The city reported that due to the project, it had gained freedom in software decisions, increased security and saved €11.7 million (US$16 million).

LiMux was the first Linux desktop distribution certified for industry use (ISO 9241) by the Technical Inspection Association. It was first based on Debian, but later changed to the most popular Debian derivative, Ubuntu. LiMux Client version 5.0 was released in November 2014, based on Ubuntu 12.04 LTS with KDE SC 4.12 as the desktop. The default office suite was LibreOffice 4.1. Mozilla Firefox and Mozilla Thunderbird were included in their Extended Support Release version.

History
In 2003 the impending end of Microsoft's support for Windows NT 4.0 led Munich City Council to commission a report on choices for a successor for use on its office computers. The report yielded two main alternatives, either migration to Windows XP or a move to a free and open source operating system based on Linux with an accompanying emphasis on web browsers as OS-neutral application clients.

A majority of Council members voted for the Linux-based solution, which was dubbed LiMux, referencing the M on Munich vehicle registrations and MUC, the code of International Air Transport Association (IATA) for Munich airport.

On 16 May 2007, the TÜV confirmed by a comprehensive certification process, the usability of the LiMux-based client as a user interface for interactive computer systems according to the ISO standard 9241-110.

The migration was interrupted in the summer of 2004, because the city wanted to investigate the legal implications of software patents. In late 2006, the actual migration began.

A tool called Wollmux was developed to extend OpenOffice capabilities in areas required by Munich Council, including managing consistent letterheads, form templates, saved blocks of standard text, document versioning and merging. Wollmux was released in May 2008.

In May 2009, 1800 workstations were converted to Linux, and 12,000 received OpenOffice. By October 2013, the city of Munich had migrated over 15,000 desktop PCs (of about 18,000 desktops) to Linux and OpenOffice.org. The usability project group interviewed users regularly to achieve a good fit to the needs.

In 2014, Munich deputy mayor, Josef Schmid, and mayor, Dieter Reiter, considered going back to Windows due to alleged productivity problems. However, Stefan Hauf, the spokesman of the Munich city council stated that the majority of issues stem from compatibility issues in OpenOffice, something which could be solved by switching to LibreOffice. Moreover, the head of municipal IT services, Karl-Heinz Schneider, stated that most things were fine, and they had managed saved some 10 million euros (more than 13 million dollars). He emphasized that the number of complaints and malfunctions hadn't exceeded the usual level for an organization of this size. Microsoft had announced in 2013 its willingness to move its German headquarters to Munich in 2016, which according to Reiter though, is unrelated to the criticism they've presented against the LiMux project.

In November 2017 Munich city council decided to revert to Windows by 2020 with all systems being replaced by Windows 10 counterparts. Some of the reasons cited were adoption and users being unhappy with the lack of software available for Linux. A report commissioned by Munich and undertaken by Accenture, found the most important issues were organizational.

In 2018, journalistic group Investigate Europe released a video documentary via German public television network ARD that claimed that the majority of city workers were satisfied with the operating system, with council members insinuating that the reversal was a personally motivated decision by lord mayor Dieter Reiter. Reiter denied that he had initiated the reversal in gratitude for Microsoft moving its German headquarters from Unterschleißheim back to Munich.

In May 2020, the recently elected coalition administration, formed by Green party and the Social Democrats, decided that "Where it is technologically and financially possible", the city will emphasize use on open standards and free open-source licensed software.

Objectives
The main goal was to achieve more independence from software distributors. The decision in 2003 had two components: to get free software running on most desktops, and to buy and develop web-based and platform independent (e.g. Java-based) business applications. A core goal was to reduce reliance of Microsoft-based software stacks and fund local developers to write replacement software.

Timeline

 
 16 June 2004 — The city council votes 50-29 in favor of migrating and to start an open competitive bidding within months.
 5 August 2004 — The project is temporarily halted, due to legal uncertainties concerning software patents.
 28 April 2005 — Debian is selected as a platform.
 6 September 2005 — The project scheduled an additional one-year pilot test.
 22 September 2006 — "Soft" migration begins.
 November 2008 — 1200 out of 14,000 have migrated to the LiMux environment (9%; March 2008: 1000=7%), in addition 12000 workstations use OpenOffice.org 2 installed on Windows (March 2008: 6000) and 100% use Mozilla Firefox 1.5 and Mozilla Thunderbird 1.5 (March 2008: 90%). 18,000 of 21,000 macros, templates and forms are changed into Linux-enabled.
 29 May 2008 — WollMux-software is declared Open Source
 31 December 2009 — The complete switch to OpenOffice.org enabling the Open Document Format as standard format is complete.
 June 2010 — "More than 3000" are LiMux-workplaces by now.
 In February 2011 — More than 5000 workplaces based on LiMux.
 In June 2011 —More than 6500 workplaces based on LiMux.
 17 December 2011 — "9000" PCs are LiMux-workplaces. They are 500 workplaces ahead of their goal for 2011.
 28 March 2012 — In response to a request from the CSU, the City reported that it has already saved about 4 million euros in licensing costs and reduced the number of support calls.
 March 2012: Monthly complaints dropped from 70 to a maximum of 46
 July 2012 — About 10,500 LiMux PC-workstations are operating.
 23 November 2012 — Savings from LiMux environment over 10 million euros.
 January 2013 — 13,000 LiMux PC-workstations are operating.
 October 2013 — Over 15,000 LiMux PC-workstations (of about 18,000 workstations)
 December 2013 — Munich open-source switch was "completed successfully".
 August 2014 — Migration back to Windows under consideration.
 October 2014 — In response to inquiries by the Green Party, mayor Dieter Reiter revealed that a transition back to Microsoft Windows would cost millions of euros.
 August/September 2015 — Jan-Marek Glogowski of LiMux presents about the project status during the "Debian Success Stories" track of the Debian conference and at the LibreOffice conference.
 September 2016 - Microsoft moves its German headquarters to Munich
 February 2017 - Politicians discuss proposals to replace the Linux-based OS used across the council with a Windows 10-based client.
 October 2017 - Once seen as a stalwart supporter of open source, the city council said that running a Linux-based operating system on its PCs would not be cost efficient in the long run.
 November 2017 - The city council decided that LiMux will be replaced by a Windows-based infrastructure by the end of 2020. The costs for the migration are estimated to be around 90 million Euros.
 May 2020 - Newly elected politicians in Munich take a U-turn and implement a plan to go back to the original plan of migrating to LiMux.

LiMux client software
LiMux Client 4.0 was released in August 2011, based on Ubuntu 10.04 LTS with KDE desktop 3.5. It included OpenOffice.org 3.2.1, Mozilla Thunderbird and Mozilla Firefox and other free software products.

LiMux Client version 5.0 was released in November 2014, based on Ubuntu 12.04 LTS with KDE SC 4.12 as the desktop. The default office suite was LibreOffice 4.1. Mozilla Firefox and Mozilla Thunderbird were included in their Extended Support Release versions.

LiMux Client Version 5.5 based on Ubuntu 14.04 LTS with KDE 4.14.3a, LibreOffice 4.15.23.0, and Firefox 24.8.1 (optional 45.5.1)

LiMux Client version 6.0 is based on Kubuntu 18, KDE 5.44, GIMP 2.10, LibreOffice 5.2.8, WollMux 18, Chrome 80 and Firefox 60 ESR and 68; Ocular is used as a PDF viewer instead of Adobe Reader (which will not be further developed for Linux). Like the previous versions, it was not multi-session capable. First rollout was done in April 2019 and is estimated to be fully rolled out in 2020.

See also

 Astra Linux
 Canaima (operating system)
 GendBuntu
 Inspur
 Linux adoption
 Nova (operating system)
 Ubuntu Kylin
 VIT, C.A.

References

External links
 
 GOsa - Administrative LDAP back-end used in the project

Debian-based distributions
Linux distributions without systemd
Linux software projects
State-sponsored Linux distributions
Ubuntu derivatives
Linux distributions